Watauga Falls is a waterfall in Delaware County, New York. It is located northeast of Delhi on Falls Creek.

References

Waterfalls of New York (state)
Landforms of Delaware County, New York
Tourist attractions in Delaware County, New York